Burnett County Airport  is a county-owned public use airport located three nautical miles (6 km) north of the central business district of Siren, in Burnett County, Wisconsin, United States. It is included in the Federal Aviation Administration (FAA) National Plan of Integrated Airport Systems for 2021–2025, in which it is categorized as a local general aviation facility.

Burnett County is in northwestern Wisconsin, on the border with Minnesota; Burnett County Airport is about 95 miles (153 km) northeast of Minneapolis, Minnesota by car. The rural area is known for its abundant lakes and associated recreational opportunities, as well as for its wintertime snowmobile trails.

Although many U.S. airports use the same three-letter location identifier for the FAA and IATA, this facility is assigned RZN by the FAA but has no designation from the IATA (which assigned RZN to Turlatovo Airport in Ryazan, Russia).

Facilities and aircraft 
It has two asphalt paved runways: runway 14/32 was reconstructed and extended to 5,000 by 75 feet (1,524 x 23 m) during the summer and fall of 2009 and 5/23 is 3,900 by 75 feet (1,189 x 23 m).

For the 12-month period ending August 4, 2022, the airport had 14,700 aircraft operations, an average of 40 per day: 99% general aviation and 1% air taxi. In January 2023, there were 24 aircraft based at this airport: 23 single-engine and 1 multi-engine.

See also 
 List of airports in Wisconsin

References

External links 
 Burnett County Airport at Burnett County website
 

Airports in Wisconsin
Buildings and structures in Burnett County, Wisconsin